The 2023 Cleveland Open was a professional tennis tournament played on indoor hard courts. It was the fifth edition of the tournament which was part of the 2023 ATP Challenger Tour. It took place in Cleveland, Ohio, United States between January 30 and February 5, 2023.

Singles main-draw entrants

Seeds

 1 Rankings are as of January 16, 2023.

Other entrants
The following players received wildcards into the singles main draw:
  Stefan Kozlov
  Alex Michelsen
  Jack Pinnington Jones

The following player received entry into the singles main draw as an alternate:
  Patrick Kypson

The following players received entry from the qualifying draw:
  Jaimee Floyd Angele
  Ryan Harrison
  Toby Kodat
  Aidan Mayo
  Matija Pecotić
  Alfredo Perez

Champions

Singles

 Aleksandar Kovacevic def.  Wu Yibing 3–6, 7–5, 7–6(7–2).

Doubles

 Robert Galloway /  Hans Hach Verdugo def.  Ruben Gonzales /  Reese Stalder 3–6, 7–5, [10–6].

References

2023 ATP Challenger Tour
2023 in sports in Ohio
January 2023 sports events in the United States
February 2023 sports events in the United States
2023 in American tennis
2020s in Cleveland
Tennis in Cleveland